Theodore Blunt (born March 22, 1943) is an American politician, educator, and former athlete. Blunt's political career in the state of Delaware included serving 16 years as a Wilmington District Councilman and eight years as city council president.

Early life and education
Blunt was born and raised in Philadelphia, Pennsylvania. He is one of four children born to Helen and John Blunt. Ted and his family were no strangers to hardships and difficult times. Growing up in the James Weldon Johnson Housing Projects in North Philadelphia, the family developed their shared belief in hard work, persistence and a strong family bond.

He graduated from Simon Gratz High School in Philadelphia and Winston-Salem Teachers College (now Winston-Salem State University. WSSU) with a Bachelor of Science degree in elementary education. Three years later, Blunt graduated from Rutgers University with a Master of Social Work.

Career

Sports 
Blunt's athletic achievements in high school included making All Public Teams in both basketball and soccer as well as being the Markward Club's Public League's Most Valuable Player in Basketball his senior year.

At WSSU, his athletic accomplishments as a basketball player included:
 1961 to 1965 All C.I.A.A. Conference and Tournament teams
 1963 C.I.A.A. Tournament Most Valuable Player Award
 1963 and 1964 Georgia Invitational All Tournament teams
 1963 and 1964 Georgia Invitational Most Valuable Player awards
 1964 and 1965 All N.A.I.A. teams
 1964 selected to participate on the N.A.I.A. Olympic Trials Basketball Team

Notably, along with teammate Earl "the Pearl" Monroe, Blunt's stellar basketball career was led by his mentor and coach, the legendary Clarence "Big House" Gaines.

In 2012, Blunt was honored as the Inaugural Inductee into the Delaware Blue/Gold Basketball Hall of Fame.

Early career 
His professional career started in Philadelphia as a Juvenile Gang Worker and immediately after graduate school he worked as a group therapist at Temple University. In 1969, Ted and his family moved to Wilmington, Delaware, where he served as a director for Peoples Settlement Association.  His desire to improve the lives of young people was further realized in the field of education, where he served as a central office administrator for 36 years of credited service in three different school districts (Wilmington, New Castle County and the Red Clay Consolidated School Districts).

Politics
In 1985 Blunt was elected to the Wilmington City Council; he served on the Finance, Expenditure Review, Bond and the Audit Committees. He also served on the Cablevision Commission, the Board of Pensions and Retirement, the Home Ownership Corporation, and the Port Authority. In 2000 Blunt was elected President of the Wilmington City Council and Chairman of the Wilmington Cable Commission. Under Blunt's leadership funding was made available for student scholarships citywide, operating hours for five community centers were extended and Wilmington's elementary schools received funds to address the needs of at-risk students.

In 2008, Blunt announced that he would seek the office of lieutenant governor. He would later suspend his campaign citing the following: The need to unify the Party; the lack of campaign finance reform and the high cost of running campaigns; and most importantly the desire to spend more time with family.

Personal life
Over the years, Blunt has supported WSSU with his time and also contributions. Consistent with his focus on education and giving back, in 2010, Blunt fully repaid his alma mater for his four-year scholarship. He presented WSSU a lump-sum check in the amount of $6,400. His daughter, Lisa Blunt Rochester, was elected to the United States House of Representatives in 2016.

In 2011, celebrating 50 years of marriage, Ted and his high school sweetheart, Alice LaTrelle (Jackson) renewed their wedding vows in the presence of their children and grandchildren.

References

1943 births
Living people
Delaware Democrats
Delaware city council members
African-American people in Delaware politics
Politicians from Philadelphia
20th-century American politicians
21st-century American politicians
People from Wilmington, Delaware
Rutgers University alumni
Winston-Salem State University alumni
20th-century African-American politicians
African-American men in politics
21st-century African-American politicians